Oceanway is a neighborhood of Jacksonville, Florida, located in the city's Northside area. Once dotted with small farms and isolated houses, Oceanway has grown dramatically since the early 1980s, adding numerous residential neighborhoods, the first high school in the area, First Coast High School, and several other schools for lower grades. Also found near the Oceanway area is a large shopping center, River City Marketplace.

See also

 Neighborhoods of Jacksonville
 Northside, Jacksonville

External links
 
History of Oceanway, Florida
 

Populated places in Duval County, Florida
Former census-designated places in Florida
Northside, Jacksonville